A2 Ethniki Handball is the 2nd-tier of Greek handball championship. It is held in two groups with teams separated according to geographical criteria. The first teams of each group promoted to A1 Ethniki. In recent year, the champions were Aris Nikaias and AESH Pylaias. The previous season the winners were Ionikos Nea Filadelfeia and Aeropos Edessas. However, Archelaos Katerinis had replaced Ionikos in A1 Ethniki, because it had withdrawn from this championship.

Winners

Recent winners
2001–02: AS Xini
2002–03: GS Ilioupolis
2003–04: Koropi H.C.
2004–05: X.A.N. Thessaloniki
2005–06: Ilisiakos/ Aeropos Edessas
2006–07: Koropi H.C./ Thermaikos H.C.
2007–08: Minotavros Patras / Zafeirakis Naoussas
2008–09: Kydon Chanion / Aeropos Edessas
2009–10: Ionikos Nea Filadelfeia
2010–11: GAS Kilkis
2011–12: Poseidon Loutrakiou / Phoebus Sykeon
2012–13: Anagennisi Vyrona / Archelaos Katerinis
2013–14: DIKE.AS. Nea Ionia / Drama 86
2014–15: Ionikos Nea Filadelfeia /  Aeropos Edessas
2015–16: Aris Nikaias / AESH Pylaias
Source:Handball Federation, Statistics

Current teams
The clubs taking part in the 2017–18 league are:

References

External links
Hellenic Handball Federation

Handball in Greece
Professional sports leagues in Greece